is a cover album by the Irish pop group The Nolans. Released on 21 August 1991 exclusively in Japan by Teichiku Records, the album consists of ten English-language covers of songs made famous by Japanese idol Kyōko Koizumi.

The album peaked at No. 88 on Oricon's albums chart and sold over 15,000 copies.

Track listing 
All English lyrics are written by Clive Scott and Des Dyer.

Charts

References

External links
 

1991 albums
The Nolans albums
Covers albums
Teichiku Records albums